is a Japanese paper-cutting artist and illustrator born on December 27, 1970, in Yokohama, Japan. She has been creating super fine lacy-paper-cuttings since 2000. She currently lives and works in Ferney-Voltaire, France.

Art style 
Hina Aoyama not only combines the art culture of Switzerland and Japan, but also originated her special paper-silhouette like style of paper cutting. All her art is done by a simple pair of scissors, yet creating a fine and meticulous cutoff. She does not follow the traditional cutting style and wants to produce a world through her super fine and lacy paper cutting techniques with just a piece of paper and scissors. Most of her work requires much time and effort as they are small and delicate. With her steady hands and patience, designing these beautiful masterpieces spans the course of hours and sometimes months. Aoyama’s art pieces usually revolves around the topic of nature; they are romantic and fairytale-like, such as her works of butterflies, trees, flowers, and lots more. She also designed a fine collection of letter cutouts with exquisite writings and amazing visual effects.

Works 
Aoyama believes that art is “the best psychiatrist in the world”, is calming, and leads people through the five senses and then through the sixth. She rarely writes the concepts for each of her individual works as she would like her audience to interpret and give meaning to her work. The concept of her cutting out words of Voltaire and Baudelaire, although she respects them, is not because she is interested in their works or poetry, but because she is attracted to their personality and their lives. She thought Baudelaire had successfully carried out his intentions in his work through his contempts. She believes that people from the past have something that our society lacks today, and that is to “carry out [the] intention” that one wants to convey. Aoyama’s creations are to remember the delicate lives of nature and to preserve the liveliness of all the beautiful lives through her black and white artwork. Through her paper and scissors, she draws out the meaning of life, death, and rebirth. When Aoyama pictures flowers, she imagines its sensations with black and white, an ”Aoyama style photography”. Aoyama thinks of how lovely the flowers once are and realizes that the flowers will all die down someday. No one can show how beautiful those flowers are at that moment, not even photos. Her art pieces with butterflies are to show her feelings towards those who collect them just for their desires, and also protesting for the animals who are killed only to become stuffed specimens or fur. She is looking for empathy for the deaths, therefore wants to “recreate the earth” with her paper creatures and see the pureness and beauty that was lost today. She wishes people can take a minute and forget about their pains and worries and just take a moment and look at her works, she believes that art exists for moment. Aoyama also believes that there is no reason to find the meaning of life; people “achieve happiness” when they go with what is coming at them and take the chance to live a life with things that they devote to, having the “passion within your spirit.”

Awards

 2008: Le Grand Prix International ≪ PAPER ART ≫ Museum Charmey Swiss, first prize
 2007: Le Salon des Contemporains
 2007: Honfleur, second prize
 2007: Triennal Palmares du Grand Prix des Distinctions Francais et Etrangers, Silver medal
 2006: Le Grand Prix International M.C.A Cannes-Azur, Gold medal
 2007: Le Grand Prix International M.C.A Cannes-Azur, Gold medal

Collections 
 Museum of Miniatures, Lyon, France
 Consulat Royal de Thaïlande, Geneva, Switzerland

Exhibitions
 Berkshire Museum presents PaperWorks: The Art and Science of an Extraordinary Material, Pittsfield, Massachusetts, United States
 Gallery Kawada, Kobe, Japan
 Arts Rush, Tokyo, Japan

References 

 https://web.archive.org/web/20160304101511/http://www.3miii.com/shougongDIY/781.html

External links 
 Official website

1970 births
Living people
Japanese contemporary artists
21st-century Japanese women artists
Paper artists
Japanese expatriates in France